James Bannerman (9 April 1807 – 27 March 1868) was a Scottish theologian. He is best known for his classic work on Presbyterian ecclesiology, The Church of Christ.

Life

Bannerman was the son of James Patrick Bannerman, minister of Cargill, Perthshire. He was born at the manse of Cargill on 9 April 1807, and after a distinguished career at the University of Edinburgh, especially in the classes of Sir John Leslie and Professor Wilson, became minister of Ormiston, in Midlothian, in 1833, left the Established Church for the Free Church in 1843, and in 1849 was appointed professor of apologetics and pastoral theology in the New College, Edinburgh, which office he held till his death, 27 March 1868, at his home, 7 Clarendon Crescent, near Dean Bridge.

In 1850 he received the degree of D.D. from Princeton College, New Jersey. He took a leading part in various public movements, especially in that which led in 1843 to the separation of the free church from the state, and subsequently in the negotiations for union between the nonconformist presbyterian churches of England and Scotland.

Works
His chief publications were: 
 Letter to the Marquis of Tweeddale on the Church Question, 1840
 The Prevalent Forms of Unbelief, 1849
 Systematic Theology, 1851
 Apologetical Theology, 1851
 Inspiration: the Infallible Truth and Divine Authority of the Holy Scriptures, 1865
 The Church of Christ, also known as The Church: a Treatise on the Nature, Powers, Ordinances, Discipline, and Government of the Christian Church, 2 vols. 8vo; published after his death in 1868, and edited by his son
 A volume of sermons (also posthumous) published in 1869

Rosemary Mitchell asserts: "Bannerman published several theological works: one of the most significant, Inspiration: the Infallible Truth and Divine Authority of the Holy Scriptures (1865), was criticized by the theologian A. B. Davidson (1831–1902) for calling forth 'no opposition and no assent' (Drummond and Bulloch, 263). Nevertheless, it sounded a cautious retreat from the fundamentalism of Free Church orthodoxy, as Bannerman dissociated himself from the theory of verbal inspiration and accepted translations (and even paraphrases) as equally valid with the Greek and Hebrew scriptural originals."

Family

In 1839 he married David (sic) Anne Douglas (1821–1879), a daughter of David Douglas, Lord Reston, one of the Senators of the College of Justice. 

They had three sons and six daughters, including David Douglas Bannerman (b.1842) and James Patrick Bannerman. A third son, Major General William Burney Bannerman FRSE (1858–1924), married Helen Brodie Cowan Watson, daughter of Robert Boog Watson, and he and his wife are buried with the parents in the north-west section of the Grange Cemetery in Edinburgh.

He married 2 April 1839, David Anne (died 11 April 1879), daughter of David Douglas, Lord Reston, one of the Senators of the College of Justice, and had issue — 
David Douglas, D.D., min. of the Free Church, Dalkeith, and of St Leonard's Free Church, Perth, born 29 January 1842, died 5 April 1903
Mary Turing Anne, born 30 May 1844
Elizabeth Craigie, born 24 January 1846, died 12 January 1875
Cecilia Helen, born 13 November 1847 (married John Crommelin Brown, I.C.S.)
Anne Jessie, born 6 August 1850, died 9 August 1869
Jemima Margaret, born 1852 (married August 1875, John Campbell Lorimer, K.C., Sheriff of Aberdeen)
James Patrick, W.S., Edinburgh, born at Edinburgh 8 August 1854, died 3 May 1905
William Burney, C.S.I., M.D., surgeon-general Madras, born 6 July 1858
Catherine Maria, born 16 May 1861 (married William Alexander Mackay, M.D., Huelva, Spain), died 13 March 1898.

References

Sources

External links
 

1807 births
1868 deaths
Scottish Calvinist and Reformed theologians
19th-century Scottish theologians
Alumni of the University of Edinburgh
Princeton University alumni
People from Perth and Kinross
Burials at the Grange Cemetery
19th-century Scottish clergy
19th-century Scottish writers